Legislative Council elections were held in Punjab Province in British India in 1930. They were the fourth and last legislative council elections held in the province under the Government of India Act 1919. The newly elected Council was constituted on 24 October 1930 when its first meeting was held.

Shahab-ud-Din Virk was re-elected as President on October 25, 1930. The Council was given the extension of about 3 years in its three years term and was dissolved on 10 November 1936. The Council held 197 meetings during its extended tenure.

Distribution of seats

Special^ (Non-Territorial)

 Punjab Landholders - 3
 General - 1
 Mohammadan - 1
 Sikh - 1
 Baluch Tumandars - 1
 Punjab Universities - 1
 Punjab Commerce and Trade - 1
 Punjab Industry - 1

Election schedule

 Election schedule in special constituencies were not same and the dates were different, unfortunately not available.

Results

Constituency wise result
 Candidate elected unopposed 

General-Urban

General-Rural

Muhammadan-Urban

Muhammadan-Rural

Sikh-Urban

Sikh-Rural

Special

References

External links

State Assembly elections in Punjab, India
Punjab